Rasmus Borregaard Winther (born 17 November 1999), better known as Caps, is a Danish League of Legends player for G2 Esports.

Career

2018 season 
During the 2018 EU LCS Season, Caps managed to win both the Spring and Summer Split with his then team, Fnatic. In both splits, he secured a spot on the 1st All-Pro Team. Additionally, he managed to win the title of most valuable player (MVP) in the Summer Split.

At the 2018 World Championship, Fnatic was seeded into Group D alongside 100 Thieves, Invictus Gaming, and G-Rex. They picked up five wins in the group, allowing them to advance into the knockout stage of the tournament. In the quarterfinals, Fnatic defeated EDward Gaming by 3–1.  Caps's performance on Azir and LeBlanc helped Fnatic win the semifinals against Cloud9 without losing a single game. After this they were swept 3–0 in the world final by their group rival Invictus Gaming.

2019 season 
Ahead of the 2019 season, Caps left Fnatic to join rival European organisation G2 Esports. G2 Esports dominated the Spring split in the newly rebranded League of Legends European Championship, going 13-5 during the regular season, with Caps winning MVP of the split. In combination with his MVP win during the 2018 EU LCS Summer Split, Caps became the first player ever to win back-to-back MVP titles on two different teams. G2 did not drop a single game in the playoffs, making them the first-ever winners of an LEC Split and granting them an immediate invite to the 2019 Mid Season Invitational.

At the 2019 Mid-Season Invitational, G2 Esports defeated Team Liquid 3–0 in the finals as Caps was rewarded with the MVP of MSI 2019. This marked the first time a European team had won an international Tournament run by Riot Games since Fnatic had won the Season 1 World Championship, and the first time ever a non-Asian team had won MSI.

In the League of Legends European Summer Split 2019 the current MSI 2019 champions returned to dominate the Summer Split all the way to the end. Caps and G2 beat his old team Fnatic 3–2 in a best of five. This gave G2 Esports the first seed to represent Europe in the League of Legends Worlds Championship 2019.  There, the team managed to go to the finals against FunPlus Phoenix, but was defeated 3–0, with Caps's Pyke and Veigar picks rendered ineffective. This made Caps the first European player to ever play (and lose) two Worlds Finals in a row.

2020 season 
In the pre-season between 2019 and 2020 Caps switched his position from mid lane to bot lane. Once again Caps and G2 ended up taking first place in the regular season. When playoffs arrived, G2's first matchup was against rookie squad Mad Lions. G2 lost this series 2–3, which lead to G2 having to play in the losers bracket to reach the finals. This went easy enough with G2 winning both the series against Origen and the rematch against MAD 3–1. In the finals against Fnatic, G2 showed what they could do and swept Caps' old team 3–0. After this success however Caps decided to swap back to the mid lane ahead of the LEC 2020 Summer Split.

In the LEC 2020 Summer Split, Caps and G2 Esports, managed to win once again the LEC Champion title and qualify for Worlds 2020.

At the 2020 League of Legends World Championship, G2 Esports was able to qualify for the quarterfinals, where they defeated GenG 3–0, but got eliminated in the semifinals by the eventual World Champions DAMWON Gaming and finished in 3rd-4th place.

2021 season 
After worst placement the organization has ever seen the players didn't qualify for either MSI nor Worlds. The roster would go on to bench players Wunder, Rekkles and Mikyx.

2022 season 
Caps started 2022 spring split with mostly new squad consisting of Sergen "Broken Blade" Çelik, Victor "Flakked" Lirola and Raphaël "Targamas" Crabbé. While the spring regular split started off slowly, ending in a fourth-place finish, Caps and G2 won the playoffs after falling to the lower bracket and winning 12 consecutive games.

Tournament results

Dark Passage 
 1st - 2016 TCL Summer

Fnatic 
 5–8th – 2017 League of Legends World Championship
 1st – Rift Rivals 2018 NA-EU
 1st – 2018 EU LCS Spring
 1st – 2018 EU LCS Summer
 2nd – 2018 League of Legends World Championship

G2 Esports 
 1st – 2019 LEC Spring
 1st – 2019 Mid-Season Invitational
 1st – 2019 LEC Summer
 2nd – 2019 League of Legends World Championship
 1st - 2020 LEC Spring
 1st - 2020 LEC Summer
 3rd-4th - 2020 League of Legends World Championship
 1st - 2022 LEC Spring
 1st - 2023 LEC Winter

Individual awards 
2020 LEC Summer MVP
2019 Mid-Season Invitational MVP
2019 LEC Spring MVP
2018 EU LCS Summer MVP
2022 LEC Spring Finals MVP
2023 LEC Winter Finals MVP

References

External links 
Matchhistory lolvvv.com

Fnatic players
League of Legends mid lane players
League of Legends AD Carry players
Danish esports players
Living people
1999 births
Twitch (service) streamers
G2 Esports players